"That Girl" is the first single by Frankie J, released from the album Priceless (2006). It features guest appearances by Mannie Fresh and Chamillionaire. The artists co-wrote the song with its producers Play-N-Skillz. It debuted on the Billboard Hot 100 on August 17, 2006, at number 100, eventually peaking at number forty-three on October 7, 2006. An alternate version featuring Slim Thug has been leaked, but was never officially released.

2006 singles
Frankie J songs
Chamillionaire songs
Mannie Fresh songs
Songs written by Chamillionaire
Songs written by Mannie Fresh
2006 songs
Columbia Records singles
Song recordings produced by Play-N-Skillz